Roslof is a surname. Notable people with the surname include:

Jim Roslof (1946–2011), American artist
Laura Roslof (1948–2018), American artist

See also
Roelof